The manga series Umineko When They Cry is written by Ryukishi07 and illustrated by six different manga artists working separately on different story arcs based on the Umineko: When They Cry visual novel series by 07th Expansion. The first manga, an adaptation of Legend of the Golden Witch illustrated by Kei Natsumi, began serialization in Square Enix's Gangan Powered magazine in the January 2008 issue. After Gangan Powered was discontinued, the manga was transferred to Square Enix's Monthly Gangan Joker magazine with the debut May 2009 issue, and continued until the publication of the September 2009 issue. Jirō Suzuki drew the adaptation of Turn of the Golden Witch which was serialized between the August 2008 and October 2010 issues of Square Enix's GFantasy. The manga adaptation of Banquet of the Golden Witch is illustrated by Kei Natsumi and was serialized between the October 2009 and July 2011 issues of Gangan Joker. Sōichirō drew the adaptation of Alliance of the Golden Witch, which was serialized in Square Enix's Internet-based magazine Gangan Online between October 1, 2009 and February 2, 2012.

The manga adaptation of End of the Golden Witch is illustrated by Akitaka and was serialized between the November 2010 and December 2012 issues of Gangan Joker. Hinase Momoyama drew the adaptation of Dawn of the Golden Witch, which was serialized between the December 2010 and December 2012 issues of GFantasy. The manga adaptation of Requiem of the Golden Witch is illustrated by Eita Mizuno and started serialization in the May 2011 issue of Square Enix's Monthly Shōnen Gangan. The manga adaptation of Twilight of the Golden Witch is drawn by Kei Natsumi and started serialization in the February 2012 issue of Gangan Joker. A manga titled Umineko: When They Cry Tsubasa, illustrated by Fumi Itō, began serialization in Square Enix's Young Gangan Big on June 25, 2011 and concluded in Big Gangan on April 25, 2013. Four tankōbon volumes of Legend of the Golden Witch were released in Japan between June 2008 and December 2009 under Square Enix's Gangan Comics imprint. 53 volumes have been released over the entire series. Yen Press licensed the series and began releasing omnibuses of two or three volumes in December 2012, and continued releasing these omnibuses mostly every three or four months until June 2020.

Volume list

Legend of the Golden Witch

Turn of the Golden Witch

Banquet of the Golden Witch

Alliance of the Golden Witch

End of the Golden Witch

Dawn of the Golden Witch

Requiem of the Golden Witch

Twilight of the Golden Witch

Umineko: When They Cry Tsubasa

References

External links
Gangan Joker official website 
GFantasy official website 

Lists of manga volumes and chapters